West Allotment Celtic Football Club is a football club who currently play their home games at East Palmersville Sports Pavilion, Palmersville, near Newcastle Upon Tyne, England.

History
Formed in 1928 in West Allotment, a village in North Tyneside, the club played in junior leagues for their first 55 years. They then joined the Northern Alliance in 1983 and won the title 8 times before joining the Northern League in 2004. The club then won the Northern League Second Division at the first attempt, gaining promotion to Division One, where they remained until 2011 when they were relegated back to Division Two. West Allotment have participated in the FA Vase since the mid-1980s and have reached the 4th round (the last 32 stage) twice in their history, in successive seasons 2003–04 and 2004–05. They entered the FA Cup for the first time in 2005–06, and have yet to progress beyond the preliminary round.

In 2001, the club moved to Whitley Park in Benton, North Tyneside after having acted as tenants at Hillheads in Whitley Bay (also in North Tyneside) from 1995. Allotment were to stay there until the end of the 2016/17 season. The club subsequently found another new home, this time outside North Tyneside at Druid Park, Woolsington in Newcastle upon Tyne, formerly the base of the long defunct Newcastle Blue Star. The move caused the financial situation to worsen and the club nearly withdrew from the Northern League as a result.

For the beginning of the 2020–21 season, West Allotment would play their home games at Newcastle Benfield’s Sam Smith’s Park. Shortly into the season, West Allotment announced that they would be moving to East Palmersville Sports Pavilion which would be their new permanent home. A ground that they would share with Northern Alliance club, Forest Hall.

Due to the 2020–21 Northern League season being curtailed early due to the Covid-19 pandemic, this meant that the club would have to wait a little bit longer to play their first game in their new home. However, it was announced that the club would be promoted meaning that Allotment would be returning to the Northern League Division One for the 2021–22 season.

West Allotment Celtic would go on to play their first competitive game in their new home against Thornaby in the Northern League Division One in August 2021 - A game that finished 5-3 to Thornaby.

Honours
Northern Football League Division Two
Champions 2004–05
Northern Football Alliance
Champions 1986–87, 1990–91, 1991–92, 1997–98, 1998–99, 1999–2000, 2001–02, 2003–04
Runners-up 1988–89, 1989–90, 1992–93, 1994–95, 2000–01

Records
FA Cup best performance: first round qualifying – 2020–21 2021-2022
FA Vase best performance: fourth round – 2003–04, 2004–05

References

External links
Official website.

Football clubs in England
Football clubs in Tyne and Wear
Association football clubs established in 1928
1928 establishments in England
Northern Football Alliance
Northern Football League